Surveyor Generals Corner (or Surveyor-Generals Corner) is a remote point where the Australian state boundaries of South Australia, Western Australia and the Northern Territory meet.

These boundaries meet at the easternmost point of the approximately  section of the Western Australian border with the Northern Territory border which runs east–west along the 26th parallel south latitude to meet the western boundary of the South Australian border.

History
In 1922 an agreement was signed between the prime minister W. M. Hughes, the acting premier for South Australia, Sir John George Bice, and the premier of Western Australia, Sir James Mitchell to set the border along the 129th meridian east longitude and defined the boundary by lines drawn north and south through the centre of the Deakin Obelisk, erected in 1926 near Deakin, Western Australia and the Kimberley Obelisk, erected in 1927, near Argyle Downs, in the Kimberley Region of Western Australia. In 1963 when the survey on the ground was continued it was realised that there was no possibility of these lines meeting exactly at the 26th parallel south.

The most easterly monument common to all three jurisdictions was named Surveyor Generals Corner at the suggestion of the Director of National Mapping. The site is not named after a single Surveyor-General, because there were a number of them present as follows.

On 4th June 1968, two concrete pillars were completed to mark Surveyor-Generals Corner in the presence V.T. O'Brien, Acting Director of Lands, N.T., P.J. Wells, Acting Surveyor-General, N.T.;H.A. Bailey, Surveyor-General, S.A.;Harold Camm, Surveyor-General, W.A.; and B.M. Allwright, Surveyor, N.T.

Access

From 7 March 2003, access to the area was restricted following a decision by the Irrunytju (Wingellina) Community in whose traditional land the Surveyor Generals Corner is situated.  Access to the area is limited to guided tours and visitors require a special permit in addition to the standard Great Central Road transit permit.

The nearest settlement is the Aboriginal community of Kalka in South Australia, situated on the Gunbarrel Highway just a few kilometres to the south.

There are three occurrences of New Year's Eve at Surveyor Generals Corner (also in Cameron Corner and Poeppel Corner), because it is located at the intersection of three time zones.

See also
Surveyor General of South Australia
Surveyor General of Western Australia
Department of Lands and Surveys, Western Australia

References

External links
 

Borders of South Australia
Borders of Western Australia
Borders of the Northern Territory
Border tripoints